"She Doesn't Cry Anymore" is a song written by Robert Byrne and Will Robinson, and recorded by American country music group Shenandoah.  It was released in March 1988 as the third and final single from their debut album Shenandoah.  The song reached number 9 on the Billboard Hot Country Singles & Tracks chart in July 1988. It also peaked at number 36 on the Canadian RPM Country Tracks chart.

Charts

Weekly charts

Year-end charts

References

1988 singles
1988 songs
Shenandoah (band) songs
Songs written by Robert Byrne (songwriter)
Columbia Records singles
Songs written by Will Robinson (songwriter)